Vehicle registration plates of Uzbekistan started in 1996. The current version started in 2009.

List of codes

01 404 UZB

Motorcycle

State vehicles

Diplomatic

United Nations

Foreign residents

Foreign companies

Trailer

Temporary

References 

Uzbekistan
Transport in Uzbekistan